KIIT International School is a fully residential, co-educational, private school located in Bhubaneswar, Odisha, India. It is a constituent of the KIIT Group of Institutions. It offers kindergarten, primary and secondary education in CBSE and IGCSE curricula.

Achievements
Education World, a magazine on schooling and education, has ranked KiiT International School, 20th amongst 1500 best boarding schools in India. Principal Sanjay Suar and Head International Curriculum Emma Pacilli were invited to Delhi to receive an award for the same. KiiT International School was ranked as the best residential school of Odisha, and is among the top twenty residential schools of India (Education World, 2012). The school has joined the elite bracket of A+++ schools of India (The Pioneer). There are only 19 schools in the league.

The school has Padmashree Ruskin Bond as its brand ambassador.

Notable alumni
 Baisali Mohanty, ALC Global Fellow at University of Oxford, United Kingdom

School student council
The KIIT International School has its own student government. There is a Sports Captain, Cultural Captain, Head Boy and Head Girl.

See also

 Aparna World School
 SAI International Residential School
 SAI International School

References

External links 
Official Home Page

International schools in India
Schools in Bhubaneswar
Educational institutions established in 2006
2006 establishments in Orissa